Roxen may refer to:
 Roxen (lake), a lake in south central Sweden, north of the city Linköping
 Roxen (band), a Pakistani music band
 Roxen (singer), a Romanian singer
 Roxen (web server), a free software web server